There are 42 listed buildings (Swedish: byggnadsminne) in Västmanland County.

Multiple municipalities

Arboga Municipality

Fagersta Municipality
placeholder

Hallstahammar Municipality
placeholder

Kungsör Municipality
There are no listed buildings in Kungsör  Municipality.

Köping Municipality
placeholder

Norberg Municipality
placeholder

Sala Municipality
placeholder

Skinnskatteberg Municipality
placeholder

Surahammar Municipality
There are no listed buildings in Surahammar  Municipality.

Västerås Municipality
placeholder

External links

  Bebyggelseregistret

Listed buildings in Sweden